The 1904 United States presidential election in South Carolina took place on November 8, 1904. Voters chose 9 representatives, or electors to the Electoral College, who voted for president and vice president.

South Carolina voted for the Democratic nominee, former Chief Judge of New York Court of Appeals Alton B. Parker, over the Republican nominee, President Theodore Roosevelt. Parker won South Carolina by a landslide margin of 90.74%,winning 3 counties unanimously Hampton,Fairfield and Georgetown to the nearly complete disfranchisement of the black majority that was the Republican Party's sole support in the state.

Results

Results by county

References

South Carolina
1904
1904 South Carolina elections